Murdochella is a genus of small sea snails, marine gastropods in the family Nystiellidae of the superfamily Epitonioidea, the wentletraps, the purple snails, and their allies.

Species
Species within the genus Murdochella include:
 Murdochella alacer Finlay, 1927
 Murdochella antarctica Dell, 1990
 Murdochella crispata Kilburn, 1985
 Murdochella levifoliata (Murdoch & Suter, 1906)
 Murdochella lobata Kilburn, 1985
 Murdochella macrina Iredale, 1936
 Murdochella superlata Finlay, 1930 : synonym of Papuliscala superlata (Finlay, 1930)
 Murdochella tertia Finlay, 1930 : synonym of Murdochella alacer Finlay, 1927

References

 Marinespecies
 
 Powell A W B, New Zealand Mollusca, William Collins Publishers Ltd, Auckland, New Zealand 1979 
 Spencer, H.; Marshall. B. (2009). All Mollusca except Opisthobranchia. In: Gordon, D. (Ed.) (2009). New Zealand Inventory of Biodiversity. Volume One: Kingdom Animalia. 584 pp

Nystiellidae